The Pawsey Supercomputing Centre (PSC) is the government-supported high-performance computing national facility located in Perth, Western Australia. Pawsey supports researchers in Western Australia and across Australia through the Pawsey Centre (facility).

Pawsey is an unincorporated joint venture between the CSIRO, Curtin University, Edith Cowan University, Murdoch University and the University of Western Australia. Funding comes from the joint venture partners, the Western Australian Government and the Australian Government. Pawsey services are free to members of the joint venture.  Free access to supercomputers is also available to researchers across Australia via a competitive merit process.  Services are also provided to industry and government.

Pawsey provides infrastructure to support a computational research workflow.  This includes supercomputers and cloud computing, data storage and visualisation.  The infrastructure is located at the joint venture members, linked by a dedicated high speed network.

Pawsey is an integral component of the Australian Square Kilometre Array Pathfinder (ASKAP) and the Murchison Widefield Array (MWA) radio astronomy telescopes.  A dedicated network links the telescopes directly to the Pawsey Centre, where the data is processed, stored and remotely visualised.  This network is operated by AARNet, with the Perth-Geraldton link funded by the Australian Government Regional Blackspot Program.

History 
The Pawsey Supercomputing Centre is the continuation of iVEC, an organisation delivering advanced computing resources to Western Australian researchers. iVEC was renamed to the Pawsey Supercomputing Centre on 5 Dec 2014.  As part of its Super Science Initiative announced in the May 2009 budget, the Australian Government allocated $80 million over the financial years 2009/10 to 2012/13 to iVEC to establish a petascale supercomputing facility (the Pawsey Centre) located at the Australian Resources Research Centre in Perth.  The Western Australian Government subsequently funded iVEC/Pawsey through its Research Facilities Program to 2015 at ~$4 million per annum, and the joint venture partners contributed a similar total.

On 14 May 2015 the Australian Government announced $5.668M funding for 2015-2016 for the Pawsey Supercomputing Centre.  Also on 14 May 2015, the Western Australian Government announced funding for the Pawsey Supercomputing Centre at $4.1M in 2016–2017, $4.2M in 2017–2018, and $4.3M in 2018–2019.  Some funding is also received from the Australian Government through other NCRIS projects such as NeCTAR and RDSI.

Notable staff 
 John Langoulant - Chair of the Pawsey Supercomputing Centre
 Mark Stickells - Director of the Pawsey Supercomputing Centre

Locations 
The Pawsey Centre building is located in the western precinct of the Technology Park, in Kensington, Western Australia. This building houses the majority of the IT equipment.

The Pawsey Supercomputing Centre has staff located at all members of the joint venture. The headquarters are also in the Pawsey  Centre building.

Resources

Pawsey Centre 
The Pawsey Centre building comprises a purpose-built data centre, housing supercomputers and associated infrastructure at Kensington, Western Australia. The Pawsey Centre is owned by CSIRO and operated by the joint venture. It is located approximately six kilometres from the Perth central business district.  The Pawsey Centre was named after the Australian radio astronomer Joseph Lade Pawsey.

Funding 
The $80 million of funding for the Pawsey Centre was announced in the May 2009 Federal Budget under the Super Science Initiative. The Super Science Inititiative addresses priority areas from the 2008 Strategic Roadmap for Australian Research Infrastructure. The funding comes from the Education Investment Fund (EIF) which is for strategic investment in research infrastructure. Project funding was awarded to CSIRO to build and commission the Pawsey Centre in trust for iVEC, the manager of the Pawsey  Centre.  The Super Science Initiative also funded $50 million towards high performance computing at the National Computational Infrastructure in Canberra.

The Pawsey Centre addresses the two priority areas of astronomy and geosciences as defined in the 2008 Strategic Roadmap for Australian Research Infrastructure. It complements the National Compute Infrastructure, whose priority areas are climate science, earth systems and national water management.

Cooling 
The Pawsey Centre was designed to use traditional water cooling towers as a reliable and cheap way to cool the supercomputers and other ICT equipment.

Additional cooling technology is in use at the Pawsey Centre to reduce its environmental impact.  This was achieved through the Sustainable Energy for the Square Kilometre Array (SESKA) geothermal project.  The process involves pumping water with an ambient temperature of around 21 °C from the Mullaloo aquifer through an above-ground heat exchanger to provide the necessary cooling effect for the supercomputer, then re-injecting the water back into the aquifer. CSIRO estimates that using groundwater cooling to cool the supercomputer saves approximately 38.5 million litres of water every year, compared with using conventional cooling towers.

See also 
 iVEC
 Melbourne Bioinformatics
 National Computational Infrastructure
 Western Australian Regional Computing Centre

Notes and references

External links 
 Pawsey Supercomputing Centre official website

Supercomputer sites
Education in Western Australia
Scientific organisations based in Australia